"Torn Between Two Lovers" is a song written by Peter Yarrow (of the folk music trio Peter, Paul & Mary) and Phillip Jarrell that speaks about a love triangle, and laments that "loving both of you is breaking all the rules". Mary MacGregor recorded it at Muscle Shoals Sound Studio in 1976 and it became the title track of her first album.

Chart performance
"Torn Between Two Lovers" reached No. 1 on the U.S. pop chart in February 1977 and achieved the same position on the Easy Listening chart in the final week of 1976 and first week of 1977. It also hit No. 1 on the Canadian charts, and peaked at No. 3 on the country charts of both nations. In March 1977, it was No. 4 in the United Kingdom.

Weekly charts

Year-end charts

Certifications

Cover versions
In 1977, Gracie Rivera made "Torn Between Two Lovers" the first track for her first album, Gracie. The song became a hit with Hongkongers and carved her name in their music scene in the 70's.

"Torn Between Two Lovers" has also been recorded by Johnny Rodriguez for his 1977 album Practice Makes Perfect, Anna-Lena Löfgren for her 1979 album Lev Som Du Lär and Anita Meyer for her 1984 album Face to Face. Connie Francis recorded "Torn Between Two Lovers" for her 1989 album release Where the Hits Are which was recorded at Muscle Shoals Sound Studio and contained a number of songs whose original versions were Muscle Shoals recordings. Faye Wong recorded a Cantonese version of "Torn Between Two Lovers" ("中間人") for her debut album Shirley Wong in 1989. Sharon Cuneta recorded her version for her album Isn't It Romantic 2 in 2007. Joey Sontz recorded his version for his debut album Chasing the Dream in 2012.

"Torn Between Two Lovers" has been rendered in a number of languages, including German, "Zwischen zwei Gefühlen" by Penny McLean; Portuguese, "Só, entre dois amores" by Celly Campello (pt); Dutch, "Hulpeloos verloren" by Conny Vandenbos; Swedish, "Ge mig dina tankar" by Wizex; and Spanish, "Entre dos amores" by Christie Lee.

The song was mentioned in the lyrics of Dolly Parton's 1984 country single "God Won't Get You".

TV movie
"Torn Between Two Lovers" inspired the title of a television movie aired in 1979, starring Lee Remick, George Peppard and Joseph Bologna, in which the song is played.

See also
List of number-one adult contemporary singles of 1976 (U.S.)
List of Hot 100 number-one singles of 1977 (U.S.)
List of RPM number-one singles of 1977

References

1976 songs
1976 debut singles
Mary MacGregor songs
Songs written by Peter Yarrow
Song recordings produced by Barry Beckett
Ariola Records singles
1970s ballads
Pop ballads
Songs about infidelity
Billboard Hot 100 number-one singles
Cashbox number-one singles
RPM Top Singles number-one singles